Shahi Eidgah is an open-air urban prayer hall meant for Eid festival prayers, built by a Mughal ruler. It may refer to:

Sylhet Shahi Eidgah, in Sylhet, Bangladesh, built in the 17th century
Dhanmondi Shahi Eidgah, in Dhaka, Bangladesh, with an urban open space and mosque built in the 17th century
Shahi Eid Gah Mosque, in Multan, Pakistan
 Shahi Eidgah mosque, located near Krishna Janmasthan Temple Complex in Mathura

Dispute
The mosque was built by Aurangzeb after destroying the Shri Krishna Janmasthan Temple in 1670.
A case is currently going on in the Mathura District Court regarding the ownership of the mosque.

See also
 Eidgah